Otto Backe (1874–1928) was a Norwegian civil servant and politician.  He served as the County Governor of Troms county from 1921 until 1928.

References

1874 births
1928 deaths
County governors of Norway